Severnaya Ferma is a rural locality (a selo) in Kubenskoye Rural Settlement, Vologodsky District, Vologda Oblast, Russia. The population was 12 as of 2002. There are 4 streets.

Geography 
Severnaya Ferma is located 66 km northwest of Vologda (the district's administrative centre) by road. Seredneye is the nearest rural locality.

References 

Rural localities in Vologodsky District